Chesterton Academy of Buffalo is a private, co-educational, Catholic secondary school in Lancaster, New York. It is located in the Roman Catholic Diocese of Buffalo.

Launched in the fall of 2014 by Michael P. McKeating, the school is modeled on the original Chesterton Academy in Edina, Minnesota and is centered on G. K. Chesterton’s ideas of integrated learning.

Beginning in the 2015–16 school year, Chesterton Academy moved from its former location into the premises of Fourteen Holy Helpers R.C. Church in West Seneca.  In 2020 it moved to the current site on Genesee Street in Lancaster, New York.

References

2014 establishments in New York (state)
Catholic secondary schools in New York (state)
Educational institutions established in 2014